The Mount Tipton Wilderness is a  wilderness area in the U.S. state of Arizona. It is located in northwestern Arizona and comprises the north portion of the Cerbat Mountains; the Cerbat Mountains extend  northwesterly from the northern edge of Kingman.

The nearest access point to the wilderness is the Dolan Springs community located on the northwest flank of the Cerbat Mountains and directly west of the wilderness area. Five access routes are described for the wilderness.

Besides hiking trails during seasonally good weather, attractions of the wilderness are wild mustang horses. Besides the peak at Mount Tipton, the Cerbat Pinnacles is a rockscape attraction on the north of the Cerbat Mountains. Some vegetation species found in the wilderness are, a Ponderosa Pine stand on Mount Tipton; also pinon pine, manzanita, and ceanothus; this is part of a piñon-juniper woodland.

See also
 List of Arizona Wilderness Areas
 List of LCRV Wilderness Areas (Colorado River)
 List of U.S. Wilderness Areas
 Wilderness Act

External links
 BLM Mount Tipton Wilderness site
 Public Lands Mount Tipton Wilderness site Cerbat Mountains map and area: 
 National Wilderness Preservation System: Mount Tipton Wilderness site

Wilderness areas of Arizona
Wilderness areas within the Lower Colorado River Valley
Protected areas of Mohave County, Arizona
Bureau of Land Management areas in Arizona
Protected areas established in 1990
1990 establishments in Arizona